The 2011 BMW PGA Championship was the 57th edition of the BMW PGA Championship, an annual professional golf tournament on the European Tour. It was held 26–29 May at the West Course of Wentworth Club in Virginia Water, Surrey, England, a suburb southwest of London.

Englishman Luke Donald beat Lee Westwood in a sudden-death playoff and overtook his countryman as the new World Number One.

Course layout

Past champions in the field 
Nine former champions entered the tournament.

Made the cut

Missed the cut

Nationalities in the field

Round summaries

First round 
Thursday, 26 May 2011

Second round 
Friday, 27 May 2011

Third round 
Saturday, 28 May 2011

Final round 
Sunday, 29 May 2011

Playoff 
The playoff began on the par five 18th, and both laid up with their second shots. Donald played a majestic pitch to leave himself no more than six feet (1.8 m) for birdie. Westwood attempted to follow him in but overspun his approach and it retracted into the water hazard. He  eventually chipped out from the drop zone and made double bogey; Donald made his birdie putt to win the title and overtook his countryman as the new World Number One.

References 

BMW PGA Championship
Golf tournaments in England
BMW PGA Championship
BMW PGA Championship
BMW PGA Championship
2011 sports events in London